Living Daylight is the third extended play by Australian rock music group, Hunters & Collectors, which was issued on 13 April 1987. It was co-produced by the group and Greg Edward; and reached No. 41 on the Australia Singles Chart and No. 25 on the New Zealand Singles Chart.

Background 
After their fourth studio album, Human Frailty, was released in Australia in April 1986 Hunters & Collectors toured North America twice later that year. The band's line-up was John Archer on bass guitar, Doug Falconer on drums, John 'Jack' Howard on trumpet, Robert Miles providing live sound and art design, Mark Seymour on lead vocals, lead guitar, Jeremy Smith on French horn and Michael Waters on trombone, keyboards. They returned to the studio in February 1987 and recorded three songs, co-produced by the band with Greg Edward. These tracks were then released as their third extended play, Living Daylight on 13 April 1987. Rock historian, Ian McFarlane, felt it was "something of a stop-gap measure". The three-track EP appeared on the Australian Top 50 Singles Chart peaking at No. 41 on the Australia Singles Chart and No. 25 in New Zealand. Following its release Hunters & Collectors toured the US and Canada for three months. Upon their return to Australia they went back to the recording studios in September 1987 and recorded their fifth studio album, What's a Few Men?, also co-produced with Edward, which was then released in November.

In July 1991 White Label Records re-issued the band's Human Frailty album on CD, which also included the three tracks from Living Daylight.

Reception
Cash Box magazine said "Australia's Hunters and Collectors are going to ignite the college and alternative nil worlds with this blistering, no holds barred, dance rock EP."

Track listing

Personnel 
Credited to:

Hunters & Collectors members
 John Archer – bass guitar
 Doug Falconer – drums
 John 'Jack' Howard – trumpet
 Robert Miles – live sound, art director
 Mark Seymour – vocals, lead guitar
 Jeremy Smith – French horn
 Michael Waters – trombone, keyboards

Recording details
 Producer – Hunters & Collectors, Greg Edward
 Engineer – Greg Edward
 Assistant engineer – Michael Winlow (tracks 1, 2, 3), Renee Tinner (tracks 4, 5)
 Recording/mixing engineer – Robert Miles, Greg Edward
Remixing – Greg Edward (tracks 4, 5)
 Studio – AAV Studio 1, South Melbourne (recording, engineering, mixing)

Art works
 Art director – Robert Miles

Charts

References 

Hunters & Collectors albums
1987 EPs